The 1979 Torneo Godó or Trofeo Conde de Godó was a men's tennis tournament that took place on outdoor clay courts at the Real Club de Tenis Barcelona in Barcelona, Catalonia in Spain. It was the 27th edition of the tournament and was part of the 1979 Grand Prix circuit. It was held from 8 October until 14 October 1979. Ninth-seeded Hans Gildemeister won the singles title.

Finals

Singles
 Hans Gildemeister defeated  Eddie Dibbs 6–4, 6–3, 6–1
 It was Gildemeister's first singles title of his career.

Doubles
 'Paolo Bertolucci /  Adriano Panatta defeated  Carlos Kirmayr /  Cássio Motta 6–4, 6–3

References

External links
 ITF tournament edition details
 Official tournament website
 ATP tournament profile

Barcelona Open (tennis)
Torneo Godo
Torneo Godo
Torneo Godo